Never Give In is the eighth studio album by Americana musician Will Hoge, and the album's producer was Hoge.  The album released on October 15, 2013 from Cumberland Records.  The album achieved commercial success and critical acclamation.

Background
The album was released on October 15, 2013 by Cumberland Records, and it was produced by Will Hoge, which was his eighth studio album.

Promotion
The song "Strong" from the album was used by Chevrolet Silverado in one of their commercials.

Music and lyrics
The album has been described as a mixture of rock and roll, country, Americana, and a version of Southern R&B.

Critical reception

Never Give In garnered critical acclaim from music critics. At Allmusic, Thom Jurek rated the album four stars, and noted how the release "abundantly captures" the musicians "strengths as both singer and songwriter." Craig Manning of AbsolutePunk rated the album a 95-percent, and he felt that "this record is the best one-album snapshot of who Hoge is as an musician." At Roughstock, Matt Bjorke rated the album four-and-a-half stars out of five, and evoked that the release was "well worth seeking out" because "Will Hoge balances everything that sums up what makes Nashville such an awesome place for musicians to live." Kimberly Owens of Got Country Online rated the album a perfect five stars, and highlighted that "This album proved to me that whatever Will Hoge sings, he never fails to bring true emotion to the lyrics, he never fails to put you on his level, and draw you in with the soulfulness of his voice."

Chart performance
For the Billboard charting week of November 2, 2013, Never Give In was the No. 129 most sold album in the entirety of the United States via the Billboard 200 chart placement, and it was the No. 1 breaking-and-entry album by the Top Heatseekers Albums charting. Also, the album was the No. 23 sold Top Country Albums, and it was the No. 31 Independent Albums sold.

Track listing

Personnel
 Jessi Alexander - background vocals
 Adam Beard - bass guitar
 Pat Buchanan - acoustic guitar
 Nick Buda - drums, percussion
 Tom Bukovac - acoustic guitar, electric guitar
 Ken Coomer - drums
 John Deaderick - organ, piano
 Kenny Greenberg - acoustic guitar, electric guitar
 Tony Harrell - organ, piano
 Will Hoge - acoustic guitar, lead vocals, background vocals
 Scotty Huff - background vocals
 Robert Kearns - bass guitar
 Kristen Kelly - background vocals
 Doug Lancio - acoustic guitar, electric guitar
 Ashley Monroe - background vocals
 Maureen Murphy - background vocals
 Jon Randall - background vocals
 Harmonie Reddick - background vocals
 Michael Webb - piano

Charts

Album

Singles

References

2013 albums
Will Hoge albums